The Waco Mailplanes are US-built open-cockpit biplane mailplanes from the late 1920s derived from the Waco 10 sports biplanes.

Development
In order to meet the demand for mailplanes, Waco aircraft developed two models during 1929, the JYM and the JWM.

The JYM was a taperwing model based on the earlier ATO design but with a 14-inch fuselage stretch to provide further cargo capacity compared with the earlier design. It was powered by a  Wright J-6-9 engine and had a single seat cockpit for the pilot.

The JWM was a straight-wing model based on the ASO, also with a 14-inch longer fuselage and was fitted with a  Wright R-975 powerplant.

Operational history
Four Waco JYM aircraft were delivered to Northwest Airways (later Northwest Airlines) in 1929 and were operated on the  CAM-9 airmail route from Chicago to Minneapolis via Milwaukee, Madison and La Crosse. All four Waco JYM's still exist, with the third JYM NC631N on display at the Historic Aircraft Restoration Museum (HARM) at Dauster Field near St Louis, Missouri, wearing its 1929 NWAL CAM-9 route markings.  

One Waco JWM aircraft was built. The sole survivor NX8550 is also preserved at HARM, wearing the markings of the "Art Davis Air Circus".

Specifications (JYM)

References

Notes

Bibliography

 Waco aircraft at Aerofiles.com

1920s United States mailplanes
M
Biplanes